de Gournay is a British company known for its hand-painted wallpapers.

History
The company was founded by Claud Cecil Gurney in 1986, in the basement of his family's home. The company takes its name from the medieval French spelling of the Gurney family name. Gurney began the company after touring Chinese factories that specialized in hand-painting.

de Gournay's wallpapers are produced mainly in China, at its Shanghai studio. The company has worked with designers such as India Mahdavi, John Stefanidis, Michael S. Smith, Kate Moss and Martyn Lawrence Bullard to create custom wallpaper designs.

Books
de Gournay: Hand-Painted Interiors  2020, Rizzoli.

References

Wallpaper manufacturers
British companies established in 1986